The MRTC 3100 class or CRRC Dalian 8MLB LRV, commonly called as the Dalian Train,  is the class of second-generation uni-directional light rail vehicles built in China by CNR Dalian, now CRRC Dalian. Since its delivery, most of the trains are still being tested and undergoing final assessments, before being used on regular services on Line 3 of the Manila Metro Rail Transit System.

These trains are the first LRVs produced by CNR Dalian, which caused some controversy due to compatibility issues raised by MRTC.

The CRRC Dalian 8MLB LRVs are owned by the Philippine government and operated by the Department of Transportation (DOTr).

Purchase 
With the ridership of the Line 3 already peaking at almost half of its 350,000 original daily capacity, there have been calls to purchase additional trains as early as 2008. Initially, in 2013, the government was looking at buying 52 second-hand trains from Madrid Metro and Inekon Trams to immediately augment the problem, but after evaluation, the order was cancelled due to less advantage and higher maintenance costs.

The first of three contracts of the Line 3 capacity expansion project, which involves the procurement of 48 light rail vehicles, was opened on February 22, 2013. CSR Zhuzhou Electric Locomotive, later CRRC Zhuzhou Locomotive, submitted a bid but was disqualified by the Department of Transportation and Communications (later the Department of Transportation). The only bidder left was CNR Dalian who controversially was awarded the  contract on January 16, 2014.

Production
Production of the 3100 class trains began in 2014. The first prototype, LRV 3101, arrived at the Port of Manila on August 14, 2015, and was assembled at the LRT-1 Baclaran Depot on September 3. It was then hauled by an LRT-1 train along the railtracks of the LRT-1 until the prototype arrived at the MRT-3 North Avenue Depot on September 5. CNR Dalian delivered all 48 train vehicles from 2016 to 2017, with some trains assembled at the  station using a temporary track extension, and at the LRT-1 Baclaran Depot in Pasay.

Design

Car body 
The car body is made of stainless steel with a livery of sky blue and yellow fascia. Dimensions are nearly the same to the RT8D5M, which are also built for single-ended operations. It is connected by a Jacobs bogie and a gangway in each railcar section. The LRV design is a one-way eight-axle motorized car consisting of three articulated cars, which are connected to each other by the joint and the cover.

Each light rail vehicle has three roof-mounted air-conditioning units. In total, there are nine air-conditioning units in a three-car train set.

Interior 
Each railcar is provided with five double leaf, electronically operated, plug-sliding doors.

Each train car has a capacity of 394 passengers. A 3-car trainset can accommodate 1,182 passengers. Two wheelchair-compatible spaces are provided beside the driver cab of each LRV, each provided with seatbelts to prevent the wheelchair from moving around while the train is in motion. The sides of the doors are equipped with fire extinguishers. The trains also have an equipped passenger emergency alarm button in case of an emergency.

Mechanical 
Each LRV has four bogies consisting of two motorized bogies at the ends of the LRV and two trailer bogies under the articulations. Scharfenberg couplers manufactured by Voith are present in each vehicle.

Unlike the RT8D5M trains, the bogies do not feature track brakes.

Traction 

The control device is an IGBT–VVVF inverter control manufactured by Voith, and two controllers are installed per light rail vehicle. The traction motor is a three-phase induction motor (totally enclosed/self-ventilated type) manufactured by Traktionssysteme Austria, model TMR 36-28-4, and is combined with Voith quill drive unit.

The traction equipment includes two Voith EmCon I1000-9AU traction inverters with 350 kVA continuous power in each that drives the traction motors, one auxiliary converter, and a VPort IO control unit.

Operations 
The trains consists of 3 vehicles, with plans laid for operating with 4 vehicles each. There was a 4-car trainset that was in service by the end of May 2016.

The trains first entered service on May 7, 2016. However, these trains quietly went out of service a few months later. No in-service operations of the trains occurred in 2017, although a series of test runs were conducted that year. On October 27, 2018, the 3100 class trains officially entered service after numerous tests and audits, with the deployment of the first train on the same day for validation tests. The second trainset was deployed from December 11 to 23, 2018, while the third trainset was deployed from January 23 to March 2019. The validation tests were conducted by the Philippine National Railways and Toshiba Infrastructure Systems.

The 3100 class trains were not seen in operations when the line's rehabilitation began on May 1, 2019. Under the rehabilitation and maintenance contract with the Department of Transportation (DOTr) and Sumitomo Corporation, the contract prohibits the use of the Dalian trains. If not, Sumitomo imposes penalties to the DOTr. After DOTr and Sumitomo signed a consent to deploy the trains, these were again deployed from October 15 to December 31, 2019 for trial runs. It was again deployed from June 1, 2020 to May 25, 2021. After a ten-month hiatus, one of the trainsets returned to revenue service on March 28, 2022, with a three-car trainset (configuration 3109-3132-3135) returning to service on the first day of the free ride program.

Currently, none of the 3100 class trains are in service, owing to the restrictions set in the maintenance contract by Sumitomo. Another factor is a pending case filed against the DOTr due to their contract with CRRC Dalian; however, the Supreme Court ruling is currently in the favor of DOTr which will allow the usage of the trains. The other remaining trainsets are likewise yet to undergo tests for deployment readiness, due to unsettled payables with CRRC Dalian.

There are plans for multiple working with the MRTC 3000 class trains.

Controversies
The trains have been involved in controversies during procurement and the trains' compatibility with the existing infrastructure of the MRT Line 3. Due to the controversies, in September 2017, the DOTr planned to return these trains back to China to have the trains fixed.

The technical issues of the trains would later be resolved through numerous adjustments to the trains since August 2018. Due to the Dalian trains undergoing the said adjustments, they are now slowly being introduced into revenue runs since October 2018.

Procurement issues and safety concerns
After the contract for the procurement of the 48 light rail vehicles was awarded to CNR Dalian in January 2014, controversies arose. A Regional Trial Court in Makati filed a temporary restraining order on January 30 after the Metro Rail Transit Holdings (MRTH), the majority shareholder of the Metro Rail Transit Corporation (MRTC) filed a case against the procurement process, citing violations with the build-lease-transfer agreement between the Department of Transportation and Communications (later the Department of Transportation) and the MRTC. Under the BLT agreement between the DOTC and MRTC, MRTC was obliged to buy new trains for the line, although the DOTC purchased the trains. The case however was dismissed on February 21 and favored DOTC. The MRTH however appealed its case to the Court of Appeals that also favored DOTC.

During the delivery of the 3100 class trains, in January 2016, the MRTC, through its chairman Robert Sobrepeña, stated that the trains will pose a safety risk to the line. It also stated that the trains did not undergo a  test run in China before the shipment to the Philippines.

Signalling issues
A DOTr official stated on March 15, 2017 that the trains would not be in use until 2018 due to lack of signalling system equipment, while the signalling system for two trains were being installed and undergoing tests before certification by Bombardier Transportation. However, Transportation Undersecretary for Rails Cesar Chavez stated on April 25 that the 3100 class trains would not be for at least until 2019 or 2020 due to the same aforementioned reason. According to Chavez, only 29 out of 48 trains were installed with on-board automatic train protection (ATP) system equipment.

Bombardier Transportation, the original equipment manufacturer for the signalling system of the MRT Line 3, has certified the onboard signalling systems of the trains.

Weight issues
Another controversy is the tare weight of the trains weighing , which is  heavier than the required . A consultant with former MRT-3 maintenance provider Comm Builders & Technology Philippines (CB&T) stated in a Senate hearing on February 20, 2018 that the trains are within the allowable specifications set by the DOTr. The railway consultant explained that the  weight of each light rail vehicle had to be divided by the eight axles. An audit from TÜV Rheinland revealed that the weight of the trains under fully loaded condition complied with the specification limit.

Incidents
 On December 16, 2020, at 7:20 PM, a 3100 class train arriving at Boni station stopped due to a technical glitch. Partial operations between North Avenue and Shaw Boulevard stations were implemented, and around 3,500 commuters were affected. Normal operations resumed the following day.

See also 

MRT Line 3 (Metro Manila)
Metro Rail Transit Corporation
MRTC Class 3000

Notes

References

External links 

 Official DOTC MRT3 Website

Rolling stock of the Philippines
Tram transport
Train-related introductions in 2016
750 V DC multiple units
CRRC multiple units